Pinar del Río may refer to:

 Pinar del Río, a city in Cuba.
 Pinar del Río Province, one of the provinces of Cuba.
 Pinar del Río (baseball), is a baseball team in the Cuban National Series.
 FC Pinar del Río, football club based in Pinar del Río.
 Roman Catholic Diocese of Pinar del Río, Catholic Diocese in Cuba.
 University of Pinar del Río, university in Cuba.
 Pinar del Río Airport, airport in Cuba.